United Nations Security Council Resolution 325, adopted on January 26, 1973, after acknowledging the government of Panama's offer do what ever was necessary to host the Council and the Latin American Group's support for this idea, the Council decided to hold meetings at Panama City from March 12 to March 21, 1973.  The agenda for these meetings was to be "Consideration of measures for the maintenance and strengthening of international peace and security in Latin America in conformity with the provisions and principles of the Charter".  The Council requested the Secretary-General enter into negotiations with the Panamanian government to conclude an appropriate conference agreement.

The President of the Council stated the resolution was adopted unanimously in the absence of any objections.

See also
 List of United Nations Security Council Resolutions 301 to 400 (1971–1976)

References 
Text of the Resolution at undocs.org

External links
 

 0325
 0325
History of Panama City
January 1973 events
1973 in Panama